Chaconne is a ballet made by New York City Ballet co-founder and ballet master George Balanchine to ballet music from Gluck's Orfeo ed Euridice (Vienna, 1762; Paris, 1774). The premiere took place Wednesday, 22 January 1976 at the New York State Theater, Lincoln Center, with lighting by Ronald Bates; Robert Irving conducted. Chaconne was danced in practice clothes at its premiere; Karinska's costumes were added in the spring season.

The finale to Orfeo ed Euridice is a chaconne, a dance form built on a short bass phrase and often used by 17th and 18th century opera composers to achieve a festive mood at the end. The choreography was first performed at the Hamburgische Staatsoper in their 1963 production of Orpheus und Eurydike and somewhat altered in Chaconne, especially that for the principal dancers. Balanchine added the pas de deux for Suzanne Farrell and Peter Martins to the 1976 ballet and the opening ensemble (to the 1774 Dance of the Blessed Spirits) for the Spring season.

Balanchine's first Orpheus and Eurydice was made on the Metropolitan Opera in 1936; his approach, the singers remaining in the pit while the action was danced on stage, was not well received; the production had only two performances. He choreographed Orphée et Eurydice for the Théâtre National de l'Opéra, Paris in 1973 and Orfeo ed Euridice for the Chicago Lyric Opera in 1975 as well.

Original cast
 
 Pas de trois

Renee Estopinal
Wilhelmina Frankfurt

Jay Jolley

 
 Pas de deux

Susan Hendl

Jean-Pierre Frohlich

 
 Pas de cinq

Elise Flagg
Bonita Borne
Elyse Borne
Laura Flagg
Nichol Hlinka
 

 
 Pas de deux

Suzanne Farrell

Peter Martins

 
 ChaconneSuzanne Farrell
Susan Pilarre
Marjorie Spohn
Tracy Bennettand corps de balletPeter Martins
Gerard Ebitz

 Filmography 

1978 TFC, Peter Martins: A Dancer, pas de deux*

 Videography / DVD 

1995 Nonesuch, The Balanchine Library: Choreography by Balanchine, excerpts (1978)
2001 Kultur, Peter Martins: A Dancer, pas de deux2004 Kultur, Balanchine, excerpts

 Television 

1978 PBS, Dance in America, excerpts
1978 CBC, Montreal
1983 PBS, Gala of Stars, excerpt
1984 TF1, Faust''

Articles 

 
Sunday NY Times by Clive Barnes, February 1, 1976
Sunday NY Times by Elizabeth Kendall, February 8, 1976
NY Times by Anna Kisselgoff, February 16, 1976
 NY Times by Daniel J. Wakin, October 23, 2010

Reviews 

 
NY Times review by Clive Barnes, January 24, 1976
NY Times review by Clive Barnes, February 9, 1976
NY Times review by Anna Kisselgoff, January 31, 1982
NY Times review by Anna Kisselgoff, May 28, 1987
NY Times review by Jack Anderson, February 8, 1994
NY Times review by Jack Anderson, June 30, 2001
NY Times review by Jack Anderson, May 3, 2003
NY Times review by Alastair Macaulay, November 27, 2007

film 
 NY Times review of Dance in America

External links 
 Chaconne on the website of the Balanchine Trust

Ballets by George Balanchine
Ballets to the music of Christoph Willibald Gluck
1976 ballet premieres
Ballets designed by Barbara Karinska
Ballets designed by Ronald Bates
New York City Ballet repertory